This topic covers notable events and articles related to 2014 in music.

Specific locations

Specific genres

Albums released

Awards

Bands formed
 Akdong Musician
 Antemasque
 American Wrestlers
 The Babe Rainbow
 Berry Good
 Cheat Codes
 FFS
 High4
 Hotshot
 Lovelyz
 Lip Service
 Maddie & Tae
 Mamamoo
 Melody Day
 Missio
 MINX
 No Devotion
 Oh Wonder
 Operation: Mindcrime
 Red Velvet
 Sonamoo
 Saint Asonia
 Sheer Mag
 Slaves
 Sofi Tukker
 Soul Glo
 Stereo Kicks
 The Barbrettes
 Toheart
 Winner
 You+Me

Bands reformed

American Football
Atreyu
Babes In Toyland
Basement
Breaking Benjamin
Constantines
Copeland
Deep Dish
Despised Icon
Design the Skyline
Erase Errata
Failure
Haste the Day
L7
The Libertines
Luna
The Matches
Metro Station
Midtown
Mineral
Nickel Creek
OutKast
Ride
Saosin
Sleater-Kinney
Slowdive
Trick Pony
The Unicorns

Bands on hiatus
As I Lay Dying
Darkside
Dredg
Foxy Shazam
Furthur
The Wanted
Yeah Yeah Yeahs

Bands disbanded

Abandon All Ships
The Allman Brothers Band
Anberlin
As Blood Runs Black
Austrian Death Machine
Beady Eye
Beastie Boys
Beneath the Sky
The Blackout
Bleeding Through 
Bomb the Music Industry!
Brown Bird
Camp Freddy
Chimaira
The Civil Wars
Clipse
Company of Thieves
Crystal Castles
Danity Kane
The Dangerous Summer
Eleventyseven
For All Those Sleeping
Guided by Voices
Jethro Tull
The Knife
Lestat
LFO
The Luchagors
Morning Parade
The Move
Orbital
Nightmare Boyzzz
Nachtmystium
Pink Floyd
The Rapture
Richard Cheese and Lounge Against the Machine
Rob Base and DJ E-Z Rock
Slaughterhouse
Smith Westerns
The Swellers
Ten Second Epic
There for Tomorrow
Vista Chino
Vivian Girls
WC and the Maad Circle

Deaths

January
 13 – Ronny Jordan (51), British guitarist.
 27 – Pete Seeger (94), American guitarist.

February
 5 – Samantha Juste (69), English-American singer and television host.
 8 – Finbarr Dwyer (67), Irish accordionist and fiddler.
 16 – Raymond Louis Kennedy, 67, American pop-rock singer-songwriter
 17 – Frank Wappat (84), British DJ and singer.
 24 – Franny Beecher (92), American guitarist.
 25
 Paco de Lucía (66), Spanish virtuoso flamenco guitarist, composer and producer.
 Peter Callander (74), English songwriter and record producer.

March
 5 – Dave Sampson (73), English singer.
 6 –  Marion Stein (Thorpe) (87), British pianist.

April
 2 – Lyndsie Holland (75), English actress and singer.
 7 – John Shirley-Quirk (83), British operatic bass-baritone.
 16 –  Stan Kelly-Bootle (84), British songwriter, author and computer engineer.
 17 –  Cheo Feliciano (78), Puerto Rican singer and composer (Joe Cuba Sextet)
 18 –  Brian Priestman (87), British conductor (Denver Symphony Orchestra).

May
 13 – Akihiro Yokoyama (49), Japanese thrash metal bassist (United)
25 – Herb Jeffries (100), American singer and actor.

June
 18 – Horace Silver (85), American jazz pianist.
 21 – Jimmy C. Newman (86), country music singer.

July
 3 – Jesse Anderson (73), American blues singer-songwriter and musician.
 11 – Charlie Haden (76), American upright-bassist.
 19 – Lionel Ferbos (103), American trumpeter.
 24 – Christian Falk (52), Swedish record producer and musician.

August
 3 – Yvette Giraud (97), French singer and actress.
 15 – Svein Nymo (61), Norwegian violinist and composer.
 17 – Pierre Vassiliu (76), Swiss-born French singer.
 19 – Kåre Kolberg (78), Norwegian composer.
 23 – Inga Juuso (68), singer and actress.
 24 – Aldo Donati (66), Italian singer, composer and television personality, (cerebral hemorrhage)
 29
 Jan Groth (68), Norwegian singer (Aunt Mary, Just 4 Fun), (cancer).
Peret (79), Spanish singer, guitarist and composer.

September
 2 – Antonis Vardis (66), Greek composer and singer.
 8
 Magda Olivero (104), Italian soprano.
 Gerald Wilson (96), American jazz trumpeter.
 12 – Joe Sample (75), American pianist.
 17 – George Hamilton IV (77), American country music singer.
 18 – Kenny Wheeler (84), Canadian jazz composer, trumpeter and flugelhorn player.

October
 10 – Olav Dale (55), Norwegian jazz saxophonist, composer and orchestra leader.
 16 – Tim Hauser (72), American jazz singer.
20 - Tyson Stevens (29), vocals, additional guitar, bass guitar in Arizona Post Hardcore band Scary Kids Scaring Kids.
 25 – Jack Bruce (71), Scottish bassist, composer and orchestra leader.

November
 6 – Maggie Boyle (57), British folk singer and musician (cancer).
 14 – Mike Burney (70), British jazz saxophonist.
 15 –  Cherry Wainer (79), South African-born British organist (Lord Rockingham's XI).
 17 – Jeff Fletcher (36), British guitarist (Northern Uproar).
 20 – Arthur Butterworth (91), English composer and conductor.

December
 8 – Knut Nystedt (99), Norwegian composer.
 12 – John Persen (73), Norwegian composer.
 24 – Buddy DeFranco (91), American jazz clarinetist.
 31 – Michael Kennedy (88), English writer on music.

See also 
 Timeline of musical events
 Women in music

References

 
2014-related lists
Music by year